KTIP (1450 AM) is a radio station broadcasting a News Talk Information format. Licensed to Porterville, California, United States, the station serves the Visalia-Tulare area. The station is owned by Jose Arredondo, through licensee JA Ventures, Inc., and features programming from Fox News Radio, Premiere Radio Networks and Salem Communications.

History
KTIP became one of the first radio stations in the West to sign on after World War II.  Its construction permit was granted by the Federal Communications Commission (FCC) in August 1946, to Porterville businessman Jack Tighe (pronounced "tie"). He owned Tighe Chevrolet Company and an appliance store.

Construction of the station was completed by Christmas, 1946. Its exact sign-on date is not known, but the station was notified by the FCC's San Francisco office in January 1947 for failure to issue a proper station identification during one hour of programming that month, so it has been concluded that KTIP was "on the air" in January 1947. KTIP signed on with a full-time power of 250 watts.

KTIP was featured in a Life magazine article in its March 24, 1947 issue. The subhead declared, "Local news and interviews help KTIP compete with big networks in a small California town." The ten photos accompanying the article helped profile a town of 6,827 people with a smog-free view of the Sierra Nevada.

Tighe's ownership of the station ended in 1954, when he sold the station to a Miller from the midwest. According to subsequent owner Larry Cotta, Miller owned the station for a very short time. Cotta recalls Miller turned the station's revenues into the black and used the profits to pay off debts he had incurred from station ownership in the midwest. That done, Miller quickly sold KTIP to Gary Garland and Larry Cotta.

In 1978, Garland and Cotta sold the station to Monte Moore and his friend Frank Haas. It was during the Moore ownership that KTIP took on the persona of its owner like few other Radio stations in history. Moore was a play-by-play broadcaster for the Oakland A's baseball team, beginning when the A's were a Kansas City team in 1962. He also did the NBC television game of the week in the 1970s.

In 2018, the station was sold to Jose Arredondo, the owner of Tulare's KGEN, after the station's operation manager Kent Hopper was fired.

References

External links

 
 
 
 KTIP radio station loses local personalities

TIP
Porterville, California